The Research and Development Tax Incentive (R&D) is a government programme that aims to stimulate Australian investment in R&D. It has been in place since 1 July 2011 and replaced the R&D Tax Concession. The tax incentive reduces company R&D costs by offering tax offsets for eligible R&D expenditure. The tax incentive is jointly administered by Industry Innovation and Science Australia (IISA) and the Australian Taxation Office (ATO).

History 

Reforms were announced in the 2020-21 budget. The Treasury Laws Amendment (A Tax Plan for the COVID-19 Economic Recovery) Act 2020 passed the Parliament on 9 October 2020, and received Royal Assent on 14 October 2020. The reforms are to apply to income years beginning on or after 1 July 2021. These reforms supersede the Treasury Laws Amendment Bill 2019.

Overview 
The Research and Development (R&D) Tax Incentive aims to stimulate Australian investment in R&D. The incentive reduces R&D costs through tax offsets for eligible expenditure. Proposed changes include a tiered system based on R&D spending for businesses with an aggregated turnover of $20 million or more and a reduced R&D Tax Incentive rate of 43.5% for businesses with an aggregated turnover of less than $20 million.

The R&D Tax Incentive is managed jointly by the Australian Tax Office and the Department of Industry Innovation and Science Australia.

Application Process

How to claim 

Companies can apply to register eligible R&D within 10 months of the end of the company's income year. This registration is supplied to the Department of Industry, Science, Energy and Resources. The tax offset is applied when the Company Income Tax Return is lodged with the Australian Taxation Office. Each income year a company wishes to claim for requires a separate registration.

The R&D Tax Incentive is a self-assessed program. Relevant legislation to determine this is the Industry Research and Development Act 1986, and the Income Tax Assessment Act 1997.

Eligibility criteria 

The R&D tax incentive is available to companies who are:

 Incorporated under Australian law
 Incorporated under foreign law but an Australian resident for income purposes
 Incorporated under foreign law and a resident of a country with which Australia has a double tax agreement

Eligibility for the R&D Tax Incentive requires the following:

 Exist as a company liable to pay income tax in Australia
 Eligible R&D expenditure over $20,000
 Have conducted at least one core R&D activity (as defined under section 355-25 of the Income Tax Assessment Act 1997)

Contemporaneous records must be kept to show that the activities claimed meet the eligibility criteria.

Calculation

Eligible expenses 

 Expenditure incurred on R&D activities e.g. salaries, contractor charges, non-capital material costs, travel costs or apportioned overhead expenditure such as rent or utilities;
 Decline in value of depreciating assets utilized in R&D activities;
 Balancing adjustments for depreciating assets utilized solely in R&D activities;
 Expenditure related to goods and materials transformed or processed during R&D activities to produce marketable products;
 Monetary contributions under the Cooperative Research Centres program.

These expenditures apply to the eligibility to a notional R&D deduction to the extent that:

 The expenditure is of a kind eligible for the R&D tax incentive;
 The expenditure is incurred during the income year.

Non-eligible expenses 

 Interest expenditure;
 Core technology expenditure;
 Expenditure included in the cost of a depreciating asset or to acquire or construct a building;
 Marketing and advertising costs;
 Bad debts;
 Donations;
 Entertainment;
 Legal expenses not associated with an approved research project;
 Director's fees.

Credit calculation 

Companies with an aggregated turnover below $20 million are eligible for a refundable tax offset of 43.5% and those with a turnover above $20 million for a non-refundable tax offset of 38.5%. The amount that can be claimed under the R&D tax incentive is calculated by multiplying the total notional deductions figure by 43.5% or 38.5%, depending on the type of R&D tax offset that can be claimed. This figure can then be claimed as a tax offset in the company's tax return. If the notional R&D deductions exceed $100 million, the portion exceeding $100 million is offset at the company tax rate.
 
When keeping records of R&D activities, the expenditure must be apportioned in a reasonable manner with the information available. There are multiple ways in which expenditure can be apportioned and the company's accounting methods and type of expenditure will influence the method that is most appropriate to use. If expenses can be traced to R&D activities accurately as the activities are undertaken, apportionment is not necessary. If this is not possible, apportionment is determined based on the type of activity being conducted, how they are being conducted and the type of expenditure incurred. Some examples of apportionment methodologies include:

 Apportionment based on time spent by employees of R&D activities over total company employee hours for expenses such as electricity and decline in the value of R&D assets
 Apportionment on a basis that reflects the area of use on R&D activities for expenses such as rates, land taxes, rent and lease costs

Government Working Group 

Australia's top tier public policy group on the R&D Tax Incentive is the RDTI roundtable. Core members include, Department of Industry, Innovation and Science, ATO, Deloitte, EY, KPMG, Swanson Reed, Chartered Accountants Australia and New Zealand, Australian Information Industry Association, Boeing, CSL and BDO.

See also 

 Research and Development Tax Credit
 Research & Experimentation Tax Credit
 Scientific Research and Experimental Development Tax Credit Program

References

External links 

 Help, guides and resources for the R&D Tax Incentive
 The Treasury Laws Amendment (Research and Development Tax Incentive) Bill 2019
 Treasury Laws Amendment (A Tax Plan for the COVID-19 Economic Recovery) Bill 2020

Taxation in Australia
Tax credits